Ella Ochoa founded the Nebraska Association of Farmworkers (NAF) in 1979 and operated it until it closed in 2011. She is also an advocate for the rights of disabled individuals.

Biography 
Ochoa was born in Laredo and raised in Cotulla, Texas. She worked as a migrant worker before founding the Nebraska Association of Farmworkers (NAF) on October 1, 1979. She also was a member of the Farmworker Justice Fund Inc between 1995 and 2003.

In 2000, Ochoa was diagnosed with multiple sclerosis and began to advocate for the rights of the disabled. In 2011, she was a volunteer with the Minority Health Advisory Committee for the Nebraska Department of Health and Human Services.

Nebraska Association of Farmworkers 
The NAF was an organization headquartered in Nebraska with locations in Scottsbluff, North Platte, Grand Island, Lincoln, and Omaha. While operating from 1979-2011, it offered many benefits to immigrant workers and helped to meet educational, developmental, and social needs.

Awards 
Ella Ochoa received The Ohtli Award in 1997, which is one of the highest awards given by the Mexican government to the Mexican community abroad. She also received the Nebraska commission of the status of women “Women of the Year”. In 2005, she received the Cesar Estrada Chavez Award. In 2012, she received the MAFO Lifetime Achievement Award.

References

Living people
People from Laredo, Texas
People from Cotulla, Texas
Year of birth missing (living people)
Ohtli Award winners